Gerald Hector Scarpelli (1938 - May 2, 1989) was a hitman for the Chicago Outfit criminal organization who later became a government witness.

Early life 
Born in Chicago, Scarpelli was the son of a baker on the Near West Side of the city. Scarpelli was arrested in 1960, the first of 18 arrests in his criminal record. In July 1965, Scarpelli pleaded guilty to armed robbery in Wisconsin and received a suspended sentence and probation. Thirty days later, Scarpelli was arrested for burglary in Illinois.

A crew member for caporegime Joseph Ferriola for several years, Scarpelli gained a reputation as a leading loan shark. He oversaw illegal gambling operations in the suburban neighborhoods of Southwest Chicago. Scarpelli had dreams of being a legitimate business owner, but never realized them. He opened a boutique at one point, but it failed in a few months. His other ambition was to open an automobile salvage yard, but could not achieve it due to his criminal record.

Mob hitman
On March 11, 1979, Scarpelli participated in the murder of George Christofalos, the owner of a roadhouse in North Chicago. Mobster John Borsellini had received permission from the Outfit leadership to murder Christofalos because he was impeding one of Borsellini's rackets. On March 11, 1979, Borsellini and Scapelli drove to Christafalos' club and waited for him in their car. When Christafalos emerged from the club and got in his car, the two masked hitmen went over to him carrying shotguns. While Scapelli guarded two passbys, Borsellini shot and killed Christafalos. Two months later, Borsellini was found dead in a field; Scarpelli was considered the prime murder  suspect.

On another occasion, Scarpelli participated with Michael Oliver in a raid on an adult bookstore in Elk Grove Village during which Oliver was shot. Scarpelli and others buried a still masked Oliver in an area from which law enforcement were later to recover five bodies. 

In 1980, Scarpelli and three other mobsters murdered William Dauber and his wife Charlotte. Dauber was a ruthless Outfit mobster who had gained control over the South Side auto chop shops, places where stolen automobiles were disassembled so the parts could be sold. Dauber worked for Outfit boss Albert Caesar Tocco. However, Tocco had grown tired of Dauber's independence and started worrying that Dauber was working with law enforcement. After getting word that Dauber would be attending court on  July 2, 1980, Scarpelli, Butch Petrocelli, Jerry Scalise and Frank Calabrese, Sr., stalked the Daubers from court, finally closing in on a country road to open fire with an M1 carbine and a shotgun. The Daubers sustained multiple gunshot wounds, Scarpelli shot Bill Dauber two more times in the head with the shotgun at close range.

Arrest and suicide
On July 31, 1988, Scarpelli was arrested by federal agents for a robbery in Michigan City, Indiana. After being confronted with wiretap conversations from James "Duke" Basile, a Scapelli crew member, discussing assassination methods, Scarpelli agreed to become an informant. Scarpelli eventually admitted his involvement in the 1980 Dauber murders as well as the murders of mob chauffeur Gerald Carusiello and chop shop owner Timothy O'Brien. 

On May 2, 1989, two days before a court ruling on his robbery charges, Gerald Scarpelli died after hanging himself in a shower stall at the Metropolitan Correctional Center in Chicago. Scarpelli allegedly killed himself because a judge had recently ruled against him regarding the Basile tapes.

References

United States. Congress. Senate. Committee on Governmental Affairs. Permanent Subcommittee on Investigations. Organized Crime, U.S. G.P.O., 1988.

External links
It's Not the Godfather, or Even the Sopranos...Making Ends Meet as a Chicago Hit Man, the Gerry Scarpelli Story  by Richard C. Lindberg
DYS Revocation Manual

1938 births
1989 suicides
American gangsters of Italian descent
Chicago Outfit mobsters
American people who died in prison custody
Prisoners who died in United States federal government detention
People who committed suicide in prison custody
Suicides by hanging in Illinois
Federal Bureau of Investigation informants